The term "Year One" in political history usually refers to the institution of radical, revolutionary change. This usage dates from the time of the French Revolution. After the official abolition of the French monarchy on 21 September 1792, the National Convention instituted the new French Revolutionary Calendar. It declared the day after abolition – 22 September, redesignated as 1 Vendémiaire – to be the first day of the Republic and the beginning of Year I.

See also
Year Zero (political notion)

References

1792 events of the French Revolution
French Republican calendar